Skat is a luxury yacht built by Lürssen of Bremen, Germany as project 9906, a number prominently displayed on the hull in a typeface matching that of military vessels. The project started in November 1999 and the yacht launched in 2002. The owner was Charles Simonyi, a former Software Engineer from Microsoft and the fifth space tourist. She was sold to a company called LoGenio owned by Swiss entrepreneur Eugenio Losa in October 2021.

Simonyi once had a Danish girlfriend who called him skat, literally "treasure", a common term of endearment similar to "honey" in English.

General specifications
 Hull: Steel hull, aluminum superstructure
 Fuel: 
 Water: 
 Designer: Espen Oeino
 Interior designer: Marco Zanini
 Stylist: Espen Oeino

Features
 Elevator serving all four decks
 Leisure platform with Jacuzzi
 A gymnasium located centrally under the mast
 Helipad on the upper aft deck servicing a McDonnell Douglas 500N Helicopter
 Observation platform with helm control halfway up the central mast.
 Two tenders
 Two jet skis
 Motorcycles and accompanying lift

A cooling pump integrated into the gearboxes assures safe operation on one engine by pumping oil through the idle gearbox. The shaft of the idle engine can be disengaged, leaving the idle propeller and shaft to freewheel.

See also
 List of motor yachts by length
 Yacht
 Yachting

References

External links

 
 
 

Motor yachts
Ships built in Bremen (state)
2002 ships